

Events
4 January – Australian long-running children's series Mr. Squiggle returns to the ABC for a brand new series. The approximate running time is 5 minutes.
11 January – The Australian version of the hit game show series Jeopardy! hosted by ex-Sale of the Century host Tony Barber begins a brief run on Network Ten.
1 February – The Morning Show, rebranding its name to Good Morning Australia (as GMA with Bert Newton) after the original title name for the previous breakfast show started in 1981 ended. The Morning Show was the future title of a morning programme which made its debut 14 years later.
3 February – In Neighbours, this was Toby Mangel, Dorothy Burke and Bouncer's last episode together.
5 February – Australian travel magazine series The Great Outdoors begins on Seven Network.
7 February – The ABC launches its first foray into early-morning news and current affairs with a brand new programme called First Edition presented by Kate Dunstan and Doug Weller.
11 February – In Neighbours, Bouncer returns; Philip Martin has a flashback to Loretta Martin's death.
13 February – Hey Hey It's Saturday and Foreign Correspondent return for another year. At 22, Jo Beth Taylor becomes the youngest television presenter to host a prime-time program as she starts hosting Australia's Funniest Home Video Show for a four-year run.
16 February – ABC transmits a television movie Joh's Jury which follows the perjury trial of Sir Joh Bjelke-Petersen (portrayed by comedian Gerry Connolly).
1 March – Prime Television broadcasts a brand new 6:00 pm news and current affairs programme called Prime 6 O'Clock News.
3 March – The Birthday Cake Interview takes place. This is seen as a crucial factor in the surprise re-election of the ALP in the federal election.
8 March – ABC begins having a 24-hour transmission for the second time, following the launch of the broadcaster's music block rage in April 1987.
8 March – British long running science fiction series Doctor Who returns to the ABC after a very long absence since its last air in January 1992. Now airing weekday mornings at 4:30 am, the series will start with the first serial of Season 19 Castrovalva and will continue until 3 March 1994 with the fourth and final part of the sixth and final serial of Season 22 Revelation of the Daleks.
15 March – Ten News Perth presenter Rachel McNally quits after a pay dispute and is replaced by Mikayla Turner.
19 March – TV Week Logie Awards hosted by Bert Newton for the 18th time airs on Network Ten. Ray Martin wins the Gold Logie for the first time since 1987.
22 March – Simon Townsend presents a brand new program on ABC called TVTV. Townsend is also joined by James Valentine, Edith Bliss, John Hanrahan, Julia Gardiner and Sueyan Cox and the series will be about television reviews or topics plus a segment called TV News which includes news on television and Townsend interviewing celebrities including a producer or a television star.
29 March – Michael Tunn narrates a series of two half-hour documentary television specials created for The Afternoon Show called Bodybeat which talks about teenagers and body issues. The first part will be about girls and the second part will be about boys. The specials will air on ABC at 5:30 pm and will be shown on The Afternoon Show which Tunn also hosted.
30 March – Mike Willesee comes under scrutiny for interviewing the two children held hostage during the 1993 Cangai siege.
31 March – The long running Australian lifestyle and gardening programme Burke's Backyard begins airing on the BBC in the UK, making it the first time to air the series in that country.
29 April – In Neighbours, Jim Robinson dies from a heart attack. The last ever of the original 1985 cast members, Alan Dale departs the series. Anne Haddy becomes the last original cast member in Neighbours 8-year history. Jim Robinson is the next character to be killed off the show following the past deaths of characters Daphne Clarke (Elaine Smith, 1988), Kerry Bishop (Linda Hartley, 1990), Harold Bishop (Ian Smith, 1991) and Todd Landers (Kristian Schmid, 1992) being terminated and written out.
19 May – In Neighbours, it was Brad Willis and Beth Brennan's non-Wedding.
20 May – In Neighbours, Michael Martin is finally arrested, and is sent to jail. The final episode of E Street airs on Ten.
24 May – Australian teen music game show Vidiot presented by Eden Gaha returns for a brand new series on ABC.
24 May – Australian children's television series Simon Townsend's Wonder World is relaunched on Nine Network with new reporters and having the title shortened to just Wonder World!.
31 May – A new drama series Paradise Beach begins on the Nine Network.
31 May – NSWRL State of Origin. Queensland vs. NSW games were broadcast on Nine Network.
23 June – A brand new Australian factual program Money starts on Nine Network.
27 June – Jo Beth Taylor gets slimmed at the end of the grand final on Australia's Funniest Home Video Show.
27 June – French-American-Canadian animated series Inspector Gadget airs on ABC for the very last time after airing on the public broadcaster for eight years since debuting in 1984. It will return to Australian free for air television on 9 June 1997 with the series airing on Network Ten.
5 July – British comedy series Absolutely Fabulous debuts on ABC.
5 July – American animated series The Ren and Stimpy Show premieres on Network Ten. It was also the very first Nicktoon to air in Australia.
17 July – Australian sitcom Eggshells returns to television with a second season on ABC.
19 July – TVNZ picks up Nine's already new drama series Paradise Beach to air on TV One in New Zealand.
31 July – Nine Network premieres a new children's Saturday morning cartoon wrapper programme called What's Up Doc?. Presented by Danielle Fairclough, the programme features Warner Bros. based cartoons including old classic Looney Tunes and Merrie Melodies cartoons and television series such as reruns of The Bugs Bunny Show, The Porky Pig Show, the fourth season of Beetlejuice and the Australian premiere of Batman: The Animated Series.
13 August – Jo Bailey quits Sale of the Century. Every week, female celebrities replace Bailey until the end on 1993 when a replacement is yet to be announced.
23 August – Australian news program World Watch begins its first screening on SBS. This series carries news bulletins from countries all around the world and gives viewers the opportunity to see news bulletins in their native language.
30 August – A new late night sports round-up program Sports Tonight premieres on Network Ten.
4 September – ABC airs the final episode of the Australian sitcom Eggshells.
9 September – American sitcom Seinfeld debuts on the Nine Network.
5 September – All Australian television networks retire the 'PGR', and 'AO' classifications and replaces them with 'G', 'PG', 'M15+', 'MA15+', and 'AV15+' ('G' was already in use prior to the change, but would now be seen in its trademark triangle instead of a square/circle).
12 September – The ABC television movie Joh's Jury is broadcast in New Zealand on TV One as part of the channel's movie block Montana Sunday Theatre.
20 September – Australian early morning news program First Edition returns with a revamped format presented by Tony Eastley.
30 October – Australian comedy series The Late Show airs its final episode on ABC.
1 November – Nine Network debuts a new Australian comedy drama series for children called Ship to Shore.
22 November – A Country Practice airs on Seven Network for the last time. It will soon be picked by Network Ten for a brief run in 1994.
25 November – Ray Martin presents his final episode of Midday. He moves on to A Current Affair effective from 1994 and is replaced in the Midday role by Derryn Hinch. As a result, Hinch moves from Melbourne to Sydney.
26 November – Final episode of Australian comedy chat show Tonight Live with Steve Vizard is broadcast on Seven Network.
1 December – The Seven Network wins the ratings year for the fifth consecutive year in primetime, with a 34.9% share for Total People. The most watched program was Seven's AFL: 1993 AFL Grand Final.
7 December – American sitcom Seinfeld switches over to airing on Network Ten following bad ratings on Nine.
13 December - Game Show The Price Is Right (Australian game show) premieres in a new format on the Nine Network with new host Larry Emdur succeeding the late Ian Turpie. The programme debuts in the 7pm timeslot over the summer non-ratings period, and proves successful enough to be given its own 5:30pm timeslot at the commencement of the 1994 ratings year, until 1998.
17 December – Australian children's weekday afternoon magazine series The Afternoon Show airs its final episode at 5:00 pm on ABC with repeats of Widget and The Adventures of Tintin which were both animated series. It was also presented by Michael Tunn who will later host a replacement music show for the axed program titled Loud.
Canwest buys Network Ten from Westpac.
Neighbours becomes the least watched drama for the fourth year running.

Debuts

International

Changes to network affiliation
This is a list of programs which made their premiere on an Australian television network that had previously premiered on another Australian television network. The networks involved in the switch of allegiances are predominantly both free-to-air networks or both subscription television networks. Programs that have their free-to-air/subscription television premiere, after previously premiering on the opposite platform (free-to air to subscription/subscription to free-to air) are not included. In some cases, programs may still air on the original television network. This occurs predominantly with programs shared between subscription television networks.

Domestic

International

Television shows

ABC
 Mr. Squiggle and Friends (1959–1999)
 Four Corners (1961–present)
 Rage (1987–present)
 G.P. (1989–1996)
 Foreign Correspondent (1992–present)
 The Late Show (1992–1993)
 Vidiot (1992–1995)
 Stark (1993)

Seven Network
 Wheel of Fortune (1981–1996, 1996–2003, 2004–06)
 A Country Practice (1981–1994)
 Home and Away (1988–present)
 Family Feud (1988–1996)
 Real Life (1992–1994)

Nine Network
 Sunday (1981–2008)
 Today (1982 – present)
 Sale of the Century (1980–2001)
 A Current Affair (1971–1978, 1988–present)
 The Midday Show (1973–1998)
 60 Minutes (1979–present)
 The Flying Doctors (1986–1991)
 Australia's Funniest Home Video Show (1990–2000, 2000–2004, 2005–2014)
 Hey Hey It's Saturday (1971–1999, 2009-2010)
 Getaway (1992–present)

Network Ten
 Neighbours (1985–2022)
 E Street (1989–1993)
 Good Morning Australia with Bert Newton (1991–2005)
 Sports Tonight (1993–2011)

Ending this year

Returning this year

See also
 1993 in Australia
 List of Australian films of 1993

References